(Niccolò) Agostino Veracini (14 December 1689 – 18 November 1762) was an Italian painter and engraver.  He was the second son of Benedetto Veracini, also a painter. Agostino was the cousin of Francesco Maria Veracini, the violinist and composer.

Veracini was born and died in Florence. He primarily painted works with religious themes, and executed frescoes and restoration of works of art. He trained Giulio Traballesi.

External links

17th-century Italian painters
Italian male painters
18th-century Italian painters
1689 births
1762 deaths
Italian engravers
Fresco painters
18th-century Italian male artists